Rožmitál pod Třemšínem is a town in Příbram District in the Central Bohemian Region of the Czech Republic. It has about 4,200 inhabitants. The historic town centre is well preserved and is protected by law as an urban monument zone.

Administrative parts
Villages of Hutě pod Třemšínem, Nesvačily, Pňovice, Skuhrov, Starý Rožmitál, Strýčkovy, Voltuš and Zalány are administrative parts of Rožmitál pod Třemšínem.

Etymology
According to legend, the castle that was built here was surrounded by rose bushes, and therefore named Rosenthal. The German name was later transcribed into Czech as Rožmitál.

Geography
It lies in the outcrop of the Benešov Uplands, surrounded by the Brdy Highlands.

The Skalice River flows through the town and supplies a system of ponds. The largest of the ponds is Podzámecký.

History
The oldest part of the town is Starý Rožmitál ("Old Rožmitál"), called the Old Town. Pottery from the 10th and 11th centuries was found here. The Rožmitál Castle was built in the mid-13th century. The first written mention of Rožmitál pod Třemšínem is from 1265. In 1349 it became a market town, in 1850 it became a town.

Demographics

Sights

The most notable sight is the Rožmitál Castle. In the second half of the 20th century, it was used as apartments and offices, and began to fall into disrepair. Today it is being slowly restored to its original state and is partially open to the public.

The parish Church of the Exaltation of the Holy Cross is located in Starý Rožmitál. It was probably built in the first half of the 13th century and is the oldest monument in the town. The originally Gothic church was baroque rebuilt in 1729–1731. The church is associated with the work of Jakub Jan Ryba, who played Czech Christmas Mass here for the first time.

Notable people
Jaroslav Lev of Rožmitál (c. 1425–1486), Bohemian nobleman and diplomat
Joanna of Rožmitál (c. 1430–1475), Queen consort of Bohemia (second wife of George of Poděbrady)
Jakub Jan Ryba (1765–1815), composer and teacher; worked here
Miloslav Vlk (1932–2017), prelate of the Roman Catholic Church, Archbishop of Prague (1991–2010); worked here
Josef Černý (born 1939), ice hockey player
Eva Syková (born 1944), neuroscientist and politician
Václav Hudeček (born 1952), violinist

References

External links

Cities and towns in the Czech Republic
Populated places in Příbram District
Prácheňsko